St Mary's GAA is a senior Gaelic Athletic Association hurling and camogie club. The club is located in the town of Clonmel, County Tipperary in Ireland. It is part of the South Division of Tipperary GAA.

Achievements
 South Tipperary Senior Hurling Championship (1) 1981
 Tipperary Intermediate Hurling Championship (1) 2017
 Tipperary Junior A Hurling Championship (1) 1975
 South Tipperary Junior B Hurling Championship (2) 2004, 2006
 South Tipperary Under-21 Hurling Championship (5) 1977, 1985, 1986, 1987, 1988
 Tipperary Minor Hurling Championship (2) 2015, 2016
 South Tipperary Minor Hurling Championship (19) 1937, 1939, 1950, 1953, 1954, 1957, 1967, 1968, 1974, 1975, 1977, 1980, 1985, 1986, 1987, 1988, 2010, 2012, 2015
 South Tipperary Minor B Hurling Championship (2) 2006, 2008

Notable players
 Séamus Kennedy
 Paudie O'Neill

References

External links 
Official web site
GAA Info Profile
Tipperary GAA site

Gaelic games clubs in County Tipperary
Hurling clubs in County Tipperary